Synodontis annectens is a species of upside-down catfish native to the freshwater rivers of Gambia, Guinea, Guinea-Bissau and Sierra Leone.  This species grows to a length of  TL.

References

External links 

annectens
Catfish of Africa
Freshwater fish of West Africa
Fish described in 1911
Taxa named by George Albert Boulenger